Juan Hernández may refer to:

Arts and Entertainment
Juano Hernandez (1896-1970), Puerto Rican stage and film actor
Juan Carlos Hernández Nava, Mexican director

Politicians
 Juan Hernández López (1859–?), Puerto Rican politician and senator
 Juan Blas Hernández (1879-1933), Cuban revolutionary
 Juan Hernández Saravia (1880–1962), Republican officer in the Spanish Civil War
 Juan Hernandez (political advisor) (born 1955), American political adviser
 Juan Alonso Hernández Hernández (born 1960), Mexican politician
 Juan Orlando Hernández (born 1968), President of Honduras from January 2014 to January 2022
 Juan Eugenio Hernández Mayoral (born 1969), Puerto Rican senator

Sportspeople

Association football
 Juan Hernández (footballer, born 1965), Mexican football defender
 Juan Francisco Hernández (born 1978), Peruvian football centre-back
 Juan Hernández (footballer, born 1994), Spanish football forward
 Juan "Cucho" Hernández (born 1999), Colombian football striker

Boxing
 Juan Bautista Hernández Pérez (born 1962), Cuban boxer
 Juan Hernández Sierra (born 1969), Cuban boxer
 Juan Hernández (Mexican boxer), (born 1987), Mexican boxer

Other sports
 Juan de Hernández (born 1947), Guatemalan wrestler
 Juan Hernández Olivera (born 1966), Cuban water polo player
 Juan Hernández Silveira (born 1968), Cuban water polo player
 Juan Hernández (tennis) (born 1980), Mexican tennis player
 Juan Martín Hernández (born 1982), Argentine rugby player

Other
 Juan Hernández Giménez (1914-2006), Spanish aviator and informant for the French resistance